Normance is a 1954 novel by the French writer Louis-Ferdinand Céline. The story is a fictionalised version of the author's experiences during the last parts of World War II, where he supported the Nazis. It is the sequel to Céline's 1952 novel Fable for Another Time, and has the subtitle Fable for Another Time II (Féerie pour une autre fois II).

Reception
The book was reviewed in Publishers Weekly in 2009: "Even at his most lucid, Céline's prose reads like rapid bursts of slangy, profane argot—problematic enough in its own right—issued in a dramatic and confrontational style. True to form, this narrative is practically shouted in short exclamation-pointed bursts (connected, or disconnected, as it were, via ellipses)[.] ... Truly, there isn't much of a plot, and readers who pick this up are going to pick it up because they're already fans of Céline's work."

See also
 1954 in literature
 20th-century French literature

References

1954 French novels
Novels by Louis-Ferdinand Céline
French autobiographical novels
World War II memoirs
Novels set during World War II
Sequel novels
Éditions Gallimard books
Dalkey Archive Press books